Hull House was a historic settlement house in Chicago, Illinois, US.

Hull House may also refer to:
William H. Hull House, Murphysboro, Illinois
Warren Hull House, Lancaster, New York
James Heyward Hull House, Shelby, North Carolina
Jasper G. Hull House, a National Register of Historic Places listing in Hancock County, Ohio
Patrick Hull House, Oneida, Ohio
Hull House (Victoria, Texas), a National Register of Historic Places listing in Victoria County, Texas

See also
Hull Cabin Historic District, Grand Canyon South Rim, Arizona
Hull-Hawkins House, Live Oak, Florida
Hull-Wolcott House, Maumee, Ohio
Hull Place, a National Register of Historic Places listing in Licking County, Ohio
 Cordell Hull Birthplace Cabin, in Cordell Hull Birthplace State Park, Byrdstown, Tennessee